Jaret Patterson (born December 23, 1999) is an American football running back for the Washington Commanders of the National Football League (NFL). He played college football at Buffalo before signing with Washington as an undrafted free agent in 2021. Alongside Howard Griffith, Patterson holds the NCAA Division I Football Bowl Subdivision record for most rushing touchdowns in a single game with eight.

Early years
Patterson attended St. Vincent Pallotti High School in Laurel, Maryland, where he played football with future NFL Defensive Rookie of the Year and Washington Commanders teammate Chase Young. Patterson rushed for 2,045 yards and 23 touchdowns in his senior season. In a game against Riverdale Baptist he accounted for 558 all-purpose yards. Patterson was named an All-State Honorable Mention. He committed to the University at Buffalo to play college football in the Mid-American Conference. Patterson was not as heavily recruited out of high school compared to his twin brother James and the two were recruited to Buffalo as a package deal.

College career
Patterson and his brother grayshirted in the fall of 2017 and joined the team full-time for spring practice in 2018. In his freshman season in 2018, Patterson rushed for 1,013 yards and 14 touchdowns. He was named the Mid-American Conference Freshman of the Year and named to the All-MAC Second-team. He returned as Buffalo's starting running back in 2019 and had the best season by a running back in school history by rushing for a single-season school record 1,799 yards and scoring 19 rushing touchdowns, also a school record. He led the MAC and ranked fifth in the nation in rushing yards on his way to being named to the All-MAC First-team. In the 2019 Bahamas Bowl, Patterson rushed for 173 yards and two touchdowns in a Buffalo win, their first bowl win in program history, and received the game's offensive MVP award.

On November 28, 2020, Patterson tied Howard Griffith's FBS single-game record with eight rushing touchdowns against the Kent State Golden Flashes in a 70–41 win. Patterson finished the game with 36 carries for 409 yards, 18 yards short of the single-game FBS record held by former Oklahoma Sooners running back Samaje Perine in 2014. Patterson was forced to sit out Buffalo's appearance in the 2020 Camellia Bowl, due to knee issues. Following the season, Patterson was named the conference's Offensive Player of the Year and was given the Vern Smith Leadership Award as the conference's most valuable player. Patterson declared for the 2021 NFL Draft following his junior year.

Records
Buffalo Bulls
 Most rushing yards in a single game (409)
 Most rushing yards in a single season (1,799)
 Most rushing touchdowns in a single season (19)

NCAA
 Tied for most touchdowns in a single game (8)

Professional career

Patterson signed with the Washington Football Team on May 3, 2021, after going unselected in the 2021 NFL Draft. Patterson performed well enough in the 2021 preseason to receive praise from head coach Ron Rivera. He was ultimately named to the team's final roster over veteran running back Peyton Barber.

Prior to the first game of the regular season, Patterson was listed as the third running back on the depth chart behind Antonio Gibson and J. D. McKissic. He made his pro football debut in the first week of the season with two rushes for nine yards on four offensive snaps. After playing only on special teams in the following two games, he recorded his first reception in the fourth week of the season on the first target of his career. It was good for eleven yards and a first down. In the eighth week of the season, he recorded season-highs with eleven rushing attempts and 46 rushing yards. In the Week 15 game against the Philadelphia Eagles, Patterson fumbled for the first time in his NFL career but also scored his first career touchdown on a fourth-quarter carry from the one-yard line. Patterson would get his first career start in Week 17 against the Eagles in place of Antonio Gibson, who was on the team's COVID-19 reserve list. In the game, he recorded 57 rushing yards on 12 carries, his second career touchdown, and 41 receiving yards on five receptions.

On August 30, 2022, Patterson was waived by the Commanders and signed to the practice squad the next day. He spent the entire 2022 season on the practice squad until November 14 when he was activated for that night's game following injuries to Gibson and McKissic. The majority of the carries went to Brian Robinson Jr., however, and Patterson only appeared on four plays on special teams. Patterson appeared in a game on January 1 and returned kicks for the first time in his NFL career, picking up 70 yards on three opportunities. He was signed to the active roster again on January 5, 2023. Patterson got his first touches on offense in the final game of the season in a winning effort. Although on the bench behind Jonathan Williams, he led the team with 17 carries and 78 rushing yards, both of which set career highs.

References

External links

Washington Commanders bio
Buffalo Bulls bio

Living people
1999 births
African-American players of American football
American football running backs
Buffalo Bulls football players
People from Glenn Dale, Maryland
Players of American football from Maryland
Sportspeople from the Washington metropolitan area
American twins
Twin sportspeople
Washington Commanders players
Washington Football Team players
21st-century African-American sportspeople